Brusqeulia uncicera is a species of moth of the family Tortricidae. It is found in Minas Gerais, Brazil.

The wingspan is about 11 mm. The ground colour of the forewings is white with some refractive scales. The dots are black and grey and the other markings are black. The hindwings are whitish grey to the middle, but brownish grey on the peripheries.

Etymology
The specific name refers to the shape of the uncus and is derived from Greek keras (meaning a horn).

References

Moths described in 2011
Brusqeulia
Moths of South America
Taxa named by Józef Razowski